Lubuk Sikaping is a town and district in Pasaman Regency, of West Sumatra province of Indonesia, and it is the seat (capital) of Pasaman Regency.

Populated places in West Sumatra
Regency seats of West Sumatra